May 10 – Eastern Orthodox Church calendar – May 12

All fixed commemorations below celebrated on May 24 by Orthodox Churches on the Old Calendar.

For May 11th, Orthodox Churches on the Old Calendar commemorate the Saints listed on April 28.

Saints
 Martyr Evellius, under Nero (66)
 Martyrs Maximus, Bassus, and Fabius (284–305)
 Hieromartyr Mocius (Mucius), presbyter of Amphipolis in Macedonia, beheaded in Byzantium (288)
 Martyr Armodius
 Martyr Acacius of Lower Moesia
 Saints Cyril and Methodius, Equal-to-the-Apostles and Enlighteners of the Slavs (869, 885)  (see also: July 17 )
 Saints Clement of Ohrid (916), Sabbas (10th century), Angelarius (Angelyar) (ca. 886), Gorazd (896), and Naum of Preslav (910) — Disciples of Saints Cyril and Methodius and missionaries of the Slavs, Wonderworkers and Equal-to-the-Apostles
 Saint Rostislav the Prince of Great Moravia, Confessor of the Faith (870)  (see also: October 29)

Pre-Schism Western saints
 Hieromartyr Anthimus of Rome, and martyrs Sisinius the deacon with Diocletius and Florentius (disciples of St. Anthimus), (284–305)
 Saint Principia of Rome, a holy virgin in Rome and disciple of St Marcella (420)
 Saint Mammertus, Archbishop of Vienne (475)
 Saint Possessor of Verdun, Bishop of Verdun, he and his flock were greatly troubled by the barbarian invasions of Franks, Vandals and Goths (c. 486)
 Saint Tudy (Tudinus, Tegwin, Thetgo), a disciple of St Brioc in Brittany (5th century)
 Saint Credan of Cornwall, hogherd.
 Saint Gangulphus (760)
 Saint Fremund of Dunstable, Anglo-Saxon hermit, killed by his kinsman Oswy with the help of Danish invaders who had also murdered King Edmund (866)
 Saint Odo of Cluny, the second Abbot of Cluny (942)
 Saint Mayeul (Majolus, Maieul), Abbot of Cluny (994)
 Saint Odilo of Cluny (1049)

Post-Schism Orthodox saints
 Martyrs Olympia, abbess of Mytilene, and nun Euphrosyne (1235)
Saint Sophronius of the Kiev Caves, recluse (13th century)
Saint Nicodemus of Pec, Archbishop of Serbia (1324)
 Hieromartyr Joseph, first Metropolitan of Astrakhan (1672)
 Blessed Christopher of Georgia (Christesias), monk at the Monastery of St. John the Baptist, at the David Gareja monastery complex, "The Thebaid of Georgia" (1771/1871)
 New Martyr Dioscorus (Dioscorides) the New, of Smyrna
 New Martyr Argyrus (Argyrus, Argyres) of Thessalonica (1806/1808)
 Saint Theophylact, bishop of Stavropol and Ekaterinodar (1872)

New martyrs and confessors
 New Hieromartyr Michael Belorossov, priest (1920)
 New Hieromartyr Alexander (Petrovsky), Archbishop of Kharkov (1940)

Other commemorations
 Commemoration of the Founding of Constantinople (330) as Capital of the Roman Empire
 Consecration of the Saint Sophia Cathedral in Kiev (960).

Icon gallery

Notes

References

Sources
 May 11/24. Orthodox Calendar (PRAVOSLAVIE.RU).
 May 24 / May 11. HOLY TRINITY RUSSIAN ORTHODOX CHURCH (A parish of the Patriarchate of Moscow).
 The Lives of the Saints – May 11 OCA
 May. Self-Ruled Antiochian Orthodox Christian Archdiocese of North America.
 May 11. Latin Saints of the Orthodox Patriarchate of Rome.
 May 11. The Roman Martyrology.
Greek Sources
 Great Synaxaristes:  11 ΜΑΪΟΥ. ΜΕΓΑΣ ΣΥΝΑΞΑΡΙΣΤΗΣ
  Συναξαριστής. 11 Μαΐου. ECCLESIA.GR. (H ΕΚΚΛΗΣΙΑ ΤΗΣ ΕΛΛΑΔΟΣ).
Russian sources
  24 мая (11 мая). Православная Энциклопедия под редакцией Патриарха Московского и всея Руси Кирилла (электронная версия). (Orthodox Encyclopedia – Pravenc.ru).
  11 мая (ст.ст.) 24 мая 2013 (нов. ст.). Русская Православная Церковь Отдел внешних церковных связей. (DECR).

May in the Eastern Orthodox calendar